Grobišče is a small village on the Pivka River southwest of Postojna in the Inner Carniola region of Slovenia.

References

External links

Grobišče on Geopedia

Populated places in the Municipality of Postojna